Manuela Gentili (born 7 February 1978 in Castel San Giovanni) is an Italian hurdler.

Biography
She is coached by former athlete Carla Barbarino since 2004.

Achievements

National titles
3 wins in 400 m hurdles at the Italian Athletics Championships (2010, 2011, 2012)

See also
Italian all-time top lists - 400 metres hurdles

References

External links
 

1978 births
Italian female hurdlers
Living people
Athletes (track and field) at the 2012 Summer Olympics
Mediterranean Games bronze medalists for Italy
Athletes (track and field) at the 2013 Mediterranean Games
World Athletics Championships athletes for Italy
Mediterranean Games medalists in athletics
Olympic athletes of Italy